Hammerstein is a municipality on the river Rhine in the district of Neuwied in Rhineland-Palatinate in Germany.

References 

Neuwied (district)